Auriglobus amabilis is a species of pufferfish in the family Tetraodontidae. It is a tropical freshwater species known only from Indonesia. The species reaches 7 cm (2.8 inches) SL and feeds almost exclusively on large aquatic insect larvae. It was originally included in the genus Chonerhinos alongside the four other species now included in Auriglobus, although the only remaining member of the former genus, C. naritus, differs from Auriglobus by being larger and not an exclusively freshwater fish.

References 

Tetraodontidae
Fish described in 1982